Caprine arthritis encephalitis virus (CAEV) is a retrovirus which infects goats and cross-reacts immunologically with HIV, due to being from the same family of viruses. CAEV cannot be transmitted to humans, including through the consumption of milk from an infected goat. There is no evidence that CAEV can cure HIV in humans.

CAEV is commonly transferred within the goat species by ingestion of colostrum or milk from an infected goat, and to a less extent, cross species CAEV transfer by sheep is possible.


Symptoms 
CAEV adversely affects the immune system of its host, causing a disease known as caprine arthritis encephalitis. Common symptoms resulting from CAEV infection include arthritis, pneumonia, indurative mastitis, and encephalitis. One of the first and most common signs of CAEV infection is weight loss. However, many goats will not show any symptoms. Goats that do show symptoms may display swollen knee or carpal joints, lose body condition, and develop a rough hair coat. Pregnant and nursing goats will display a "hard udder", which is firm and swollen, and produce very little milk.

Society and Culture 

After Charlie Sheen was infected with HIV, he sought alternative treatments from Dr. Sam Chachoua, who does not have a license to practice medicine in the United States. He told Sheen to stop taking his anti-retroviral medications, despite the dangers. Chachoua illegally administered his own treatment, which included goat's milk from an area in Mexico where many goats are infected with CAEV. Chachoua claimed that Sheen's therapeutic side effects disappeared after he administered his "alternative" therapy, and that Sheen became "HIV-negative". Later tests found that Sheen was still HIV-positive.

References

Lentiviruses